Amos Korankye (born 6 June 1990) is a Ghanaian footballer who currently plays as a right-back for Ghana Premier League side Cape Coast Ebusua Dwarfs.

Career 
Korankye played for Elmina Sharks in the Ghana Division One League in 2012–13. He switched side and joined with Sekondi Hasaacas in 2013–14 after they gained promotion and returned to the Ghana Premier League. During his time at the club, he played alongside players like Eric Bekoe, Daniel Egyin and George Owu. On 27 February 2016, Koranteng scored a goal of the season contender by scoring 40 meter stunner against Techiman City in week two of the league at the Sekondi stadium. He was linked to Hearts of Oak, Asante Kotoko and Medeama following his impressive performance with the club.

He joined the latter, Medeama in May 2016 during the second transfer period of the 2016 Ghanaian Premier League. In the 2017 season, he played 16 league matches, made 7 assists and scored one goal. He also played a part in their 2016 CAF Confederations Cup campaign helping them to reach the group stages. Due to that performance, he was linked with Tanzanian club Simba. In June 2017, he was suspended by Medeama after he absconded from the team's camp and missed out on training sessions for three weeks without approval.

In November 2017, he was again linked with a move to Hearts of Oak, however he stayed at Medeama. He featured for the Tarkwa-based side for three seasons before his contract which was set to expire in 2020 was terminated in February 2019. He departed also due to limited play time after the emergence of Samuel Appiah. He joined Cape Coast Ebusua Dwarfs in 2019 as a free agent ahead of the 2019–20 season. In March 2020, he was suspended indefinitely for professional misconduct.

Korankye joined Ghana Division One League side Nzema Kotoko in 2020–21 season, in quest to win their zone and gain promotion to the GPL for the first time in the club's history. In July 2021, was suspended indefinitely by the club on the grounds of gross disrespect and indiscipline. This was the third time he had faced just a situation after being suspended during time his time at Medeama and Ebusua Dwarfs.

References

External links 

 
 

Living people
1990 births
Association football defenders
Ghanaian footballers
Sekondi Hasaacas F.C. players
Medeama SC players
Ebusua Dwarfs players
Ghana Premier League players